Fabien Ateba (born May 30, 1991) is a French-Cameroonian basketball player who plays for the French Pro B league club Hyeres-Toulon. He plays for the Cameroon national team, his first selection for his country was in August 2022.

References

1991 births
Living people
French men's basketball players
Sportspeople from Argenteuil
HTV Basket players
Shooting guards